Sariye Kumral (born 23 February 1979) is a Turkish professional female basketball player, formally of Galatasaray Medical Park
.

Gökçe also played for Beşiktaş (1994-00), Fenerbahçe Istanbul (2000–03), Erdemir (2003–04), Ceyhan Belediyesi (2004–05), Mersin Büyükşehir Belediyesi (2005–06), Beşiktaş Cola Turka (2006–07), Galatasaray Istanbul (2007–08).

See also
 Turkish women in sports

References

External links
Player Profile at Eurobasket Women 2009

1979 births
Living people
Beşiktaş women's basketball players
Fenerbahçe women's basketball players
Galatasaray S.K. (women's basketball) players
Mersin Büyükşehir Belediyesi women's basketball players
Shooting guards
Sportspeople from Samsun
Turkish women's basketball players